Valentin Ivanov Dimov (born 12 March 1989) is a former professional Bulgarian tennis player. On 8 March 2010, he reached his highest ATP singles ranking of 621 whilst his best doubles ranking was 694 on 24 August 2009. He is the current captain of the Bulgarian Davis Cup team since 2022.

Year-end rankings

Challenger and Futures Finals

Singles: 1 (1–0)

Doubles: 7 (0–7)

Davis Cup 
Valentin Dimov debuted for the Bulgaria Davis Cup team in 2009. Since then he has 5 nominations with 3 ties played, his singles W/L record is 0–2 and doubles W/L record is 0–1 (0–3 overall).

Singles (0–2)

Doubles (0–1)

References

External links
 
 
 
 

Bulgarian male tennis players
1989 births
Living people
Sportspeople from Sofia
21st-century Bulgarian people